The Watchful Eye is an American drama mystery thriller television series created by Julie Durk that premiered on Freeform on January 30, 2023.

Cast and characters

Main

 Mariel Molino as Elena Santos, a recently hired live-in nanny who moves into The Greybourne
 Warren Christie as Matthew Ward, a wealthy architect who recently lost his wife
 Amy Acker as Tory Ayres, Matthew's sister-in-law
 Jon Ecker as Scott Macedo, Elena's scheming secret boyfriend who is a detective 
 Aliyah Royale as Ginny Welles, Elena's new friend who is a nanny at The Greybourne
 Lex Lumpkin as Elliot Schwartz, a teenager who lives in The Greybourne that becomes friends with Elena
 Henry Joseph Samiri as Jasper Ward, Matthew's young son who recently lost his mother
 Kelly Bishop as Mrs. Ivey, a longtime resident at The Greybourne and the aunt of Matthew's wife

Recurring

 Grace Kaufman as Bennet Ayres, Tory's eldest stepdaughter
 Christopher Redman as Dick Ayres, Tory's husband who is a doctor
 Megan Best as Darcy Ayres, Tory's youngest stepdaughter
 Baraka Rahmani as Alex Toubassy, one of Elena's nanny friends
 Clare Filipow as Kim Stewart, another nanny friend of Elena's
 Emily Tennant as Allie Ward, Matthew's deceased wife
 Lachlan Quarmby as James Gianfranco, a male nanny who is a friend of Ginny's
 Andres Velez as Roman, Elena's best friend who works a doorman at The Greybourne

Production

Development
On September 13, 2021, Freeform gave the series a pilot order. On June 30, 2022, The Watchful Eye was picked up to series by Freeform. The series is created by Julie Durk and executive produced by Emily Fox, Ryan Seacrest, Nina Wass, Andrea Shay, and Jeffrey Reiner. Fox also serves as the showrunner. Reiner directed the pilot. Ryan Seacrest Productions and ABC Signature are producing the series. On July 15, 2022, René G. Boscio was hired as the composer for the series.

Casting
Upon the pilot order announcement, Andrea Londo, Warren Christie, Kelly Bishop, Amy Acker, Jon Ecker, Lex Lumpkin, Henry Joseph Samiri, and Aliyah Royale were cast to star. On June 30, 2022, it was reported that Mariel Molino replaced Londo in the lead role who was cast in the pilot.

Filming
Filming for the series began April 26, 2022 and concluded on September 1, 2022 in Burnaby, British Columbia, Canada.

Episodes

Broadcast
The Watchful Eye premiered on Freeform on January 30, 2023, with two new episodes. It also simulcasted the two-episode premiere on ABC Spark in Canada the same day.

Reception

Critical response
The review aggregator website Rotten Tomatoes reported an 80% approval rating with an average rating of 5.5/10, based on 5 critic reviews. Metacritic, which uses a weighted average, assigned a score of 57 out of 100 based on 4 critics, indicating "mixed or average reviews".

Ratings

References

External links

 

2020s American drama television series
2020s American mystery television series
2023 American television series debuts
American thriller television series
English-language television shows
Freeform (TV channel) original programming
Television series by ABC Signature Studios
Television series by Ryan Seacrest Productions
Television shows filmed in Burnaby
Television shows set in New York City